Mount Tempü is a peak of the Barail Range rising at the mountainous border of the Indian states of Manipur and Nagaland. With a height of 2994 m above sea level, Tempü is the highest peak in present day Indian state of Manipur and the second highest in the Barail Range.

Geography 
Mount Tempü is located at an altitude of 2994m above mean sea level. The peak is located in the western part of Viswema—the starting point of the climb. The peak is surrounded by other Naga communities such as Mao Nagas and Maram Nagas. Occasionally the peak is snow covered during the winter months.  On clear day one can catch a glimpse of Loktak Lake in the distance.

Access

Transportation 
The Asian Highway 1 and also the NH-2 passes through its foothills. The nearest airport is Dimapur Airport at Chümoukedima about 96 kilometres (60 miles) away from Viswema while the Bir Tikendrajit International Airport is located about 120 kilometres (75 miles) south of Viswema.

Climbing route 
The peak can be access from the same route to Dzüko Valley that is from the foothills of Viswema. Here one can hike or take a ride to the rest house above Teyozwü Hill. From here one has to climb forty minutes to the top of the mountain (Khiyoke). Here the path on the left leads to Mount Tempü whereas on the right leads to Dzüko Valley. Mount Tempü is about two hours climb from Khiyoke.

See also 
 Dzüko Valley
 Kezol-tsa Forest
 Viswema

References

External links 

Viswema
Mountains of India
Landforms of Manipur